Elena Yurievna Danilova is a former international Russian football forward who played for Ryazan VDV.

At 16 she took part in the 2003 World Cup. She scored Russia's last goal in the tournament, in the quarterfinals against eventual champions Germany. Two years later she led with 9 goals the Under-19 NT in Russia's first international women's football triumph, the 2005 U-19 Euro. Danilova was named the competition's MVP. The following year she was included in the 2006 U-20 World Cup All-Star Team. She was also the top scorer of the 2006 U-19 Euro.

Danilova missed the 2008 season and the 2009 Euro qualifying because of a knee injury she suffered during a move to WPSL's FC Indiana, but she recovered in time for the tournament and took part in Russia's three games. She scored five goals in the 2011 World Cup qualifying, four of them against Kazakhstan.

International goals

Honours

Club

Energiya Voronezh	
 Russian Women's Championship: Winner 2002, 2003
F.C. Indiana
 Women's Premier Soccer League: Winner 2007
Rossiyanka
 Russian Women's Cup: Winner 2009
Ryazan VDV
 Russian Women's Championship: Winner 2013, 2017
 Russian Women's Cup: Winner 2014

Rusia National team (U19)

 UEFA Women's Under-19 Championship: Winner 2005

Individual
 UEFA Women's Under-19 Championship: Best Player 2005
 UEFA Women's Under-19 Championship: Topscorer 2005 (9 goals)
Russian League top scorer: 2013, 2017, 2018

References

1987 births
Living people
Russian women's footballers
People from Voronezh
Russia women's international footballers
2003 FIFA Women's World Cup players
FC Energy Voronezh players
Ryazan-VDV players
WFC Rossiyanka players
Expatriate women's soccer players in the United States
Women's association football forwards
F.C. Indiana players
Russian Women's Football Championship players
Russian expatriate sportspeople in the United States
Women's Premier Soccer League players
UEFA Women's Euro 2017 players